David Young Copeland III (January 10, 1931 – June 5, 2019) was an American politician in the state of Tennessee.

Biography 

Copeland served in the Tennessee House of Representatives as a Republican from the 30th District from 1968 to 1992. A native of Tampa, Florida, he was a businessman and alumnus of McKenzie Business College. Copeland served in the United States Army during the Korean War. He also ran an unsuccessful campaign for Governor of Tennessee in the 1994 election.

On June 5, 2019, Copeland died at the age of 88.

References

1931 births
2019 deaths
Politicians from Tampa, Florida
Politicians from Chattanooga, Tennessee
Military personnel from Florida
Republican Party members of the Tennessee House of Representatives
Candidates in the 1994 United States elections